Peggy Dawson-Scott (1920 – 1993), born Peggy Maccorkindale, was a British amateur tennis player.

Born in Oxfordshire, Dawson-Scott was active in the 1940s and 1950s. She reached the singles quarter-finals of the 1949 Wimbledon Championships, beating sixth seed Jean Quertier en route.

Dawson-Scott's first marriage was to Scottish rugby union international William Penman in 1940. He was killed in World War II while serving with the Royal Air Force and she remarried in 1945 to Edward Dawson Scott.

References

1920 births
1993 deaths
British female tennis players
English female tennis players
Tennis people from Oxfordshire
People from Brentford